Joseph Sidney Urwin (25 February 1909 – Q1 1976) was an English professional footballer who played as an outside right.

Career
Born in High Spen, Urwin moved from Tanfield Lea Institute to Bradford City in September 1930. He made 1 league and 1 FA Cup appearance for the club, before moving to Chesterfield in June 1931. He later played for Throckley Welfare, Lincoln City and Stockport County. At Lincoln he made 8 league appearances between December 1933 and July 1934.

Sources

References

1909 births
1976 deaths
English footballers
Bradford City A.F.C. players
Chesterfield F.C. players
Lincoln City F.C. players
Stockport County F.C. players
English Football League players
Association football outside forwards